Ryley is a given name and a surname. Ryley could also be a variant of the forename Riley. Notable people with the name include:

Surname
Bryan Ryley, a Canadian artist and educator
Charles Reuben Ryley (1752?–1798) an English painter
J. H. Ryley (c.1841–1922), an English singer and actor

Given name
Ryley Barnes (born 1993), Canadian volleyball player
Ryley Batt (born 1989), Australian wheelchair rugby player
Ryley Dunn (born 1985), Australian football player
Ryley Gilliam (born 1996), American baseball player
Ryley Jacks (born 1992), Canadian rugby player
Ryley Kraft (born 1998), American soccer player
Ryley Miller (born 1992), Canadian ice hockey player
Ryley Stoddart (born 1999), Australian football player
Ryley Walker (born 1989), American guitarist

See also
Riley (disambiguation)